The 2011 Honkbal Hoofdklasse season began on Thursday, April 7 and ended on September 11.

Standings

Team rosters

League leaders

(Updated through June 13)

All-Star game
The 2011 Honkbal Hoofdklasse All-Star Game will be the 2nd midseason exhibition between the all-stars divided in teams North and South. The all-stars from Amsterdam, Bussum and Haarlem and Hoofddorp will make up team North. The all-stars from The Hague, Rotterdam and Utrecht will make up team South.

The game will be held on June 19 at the Sportcomplex De Paperclip, the home of UVV.

Rosters
Votes were cast online. The results were published on June 13.

North

South

Postseason

Playoffs

Playdowns

Holland Series

Promotion/relegation Series

References

External links
De Nederlandse honkbalsite
KNBSB - The Dutch Baseball and Softball Association

Honkbal Hoofdklasse
Honk